Waleedha Waleed is a Maldivian film actress, choreographer, director, seamstress and politician.

Career
In 1989, at the age of fourteen, Waleedha Waleed made her screen debut with a video single directed by Musthafa Hussain. She went on to feature in several other video songs and films. Waleed had most recognition for her songs included in the Vasmeeru album, which was produced by Television Maldives. In an interview with Avas, Waleed mentioned; "What made me go a long way in my career is the belief that people cheer me as a good dancer though I am not trained in any dance style". She then featured in some of the films including Ibrahim Rasheed's Loabeege Thoofan (1991) opposite Reeko Moosa Manik. Her next appearance came in Ibrahim Rasheed-directed film Beyvafaa where she plays a blind orphan.

Hamid Ali's Badhal was released in 1996, in which she starred alongside Ali, Hussain Sobah and Niuma Mohamed as a mentally challenged young woman with an immature attitude who is being duped in a series of events caused due to a misunderstanding by a "non-existent" twin. This was followed by the Yoosuf Rafeeu's comedy film Nibu, an unofficial remake of Gulzar's Bollywood comedy film Angoor (1982), which focuses on two pairs of identical twins separated at birth and how their lives go haywire when they meet in adulthood. In 1998, Waleed played the role of a seductive woman trying to break a happy marriage in the Abdul Faththaah-directed romantic drama series Aisha alongside Jamsheedha Ahmed and Ibrahim Hilmy.

In 2000, Waleed starred alongside Ahmed Asim, Mariyam Nazima and Koyya Hassan Manik in the Haajara Abdul Kareem-directed Ajaaib which depicts the relationship of two exemplary wives and their respective families regardless of societal norms. The following year, she appeared as an understanding wife in Aslam Rasheed's romantic thriller film Dheevaanaa which was an unofficial remake of Ram Gopal Varma's romantic thriller Pyaar Tune Kya Kiya (2001) starring Urmila Matondkar, Fardeen Khan and Sonali Kulkarni. The film narrates the story of a woman who falls in love with an already married photographer and sets out to get what she wants, no matter what the consequences may be. The same year she starred as a mentally ill woman in Fathimath Nahula's drama film Naaummeedhu (2000) which depicts the story of a happily married couple whose life is shattered into pieces when they unintentionally invite a seductive woman into their life. The film received favorable reviews from critics and emerged as the highest grossing Maldivian film of the year.

Waleed worked with Amjad Ibrahim for his romantic horror film Dhonkamana (2003) which narrates the romantic relationship between a young man (played by Yoosuf Shafeeu) and an old woman (played by Fauziyya Hassan). Featuring Hassan, Yoosuf Shafeeu, Sheela Najeeb, Niuma Mohamed, Sheereen Abdul Wahid and Amira Ismail, the film received mainly negative reviews from critics though its portrayal of the relationship between a couple with a large age difference was praised. Waleed collaborated with Abdul Faththaah for his romantic disaster film, Hureemey Inthizaarugaa (2005) cast along with Ravee Farooq, Mariyam Zuhura, Ibrahim Jihad and Neena Saleem. The film, heavily reliant on the effect of the 2004 Indian Ocean earthquake on the Maldives, received favorable reviews from critics though it failed to perform financially. She played the rich woman who fulfills all her needs through money. Besides acting, Waleed has directed some television series made for Television Maldives.

Politics
On 7 January 2018, Waleed was elected as the president of the Women’s League of Jumhooree Party. On 23 December 2018, Ibrahim Mohamed Solih appointed Waleed as Deputy Minister of Arts, Culture and Heritage.

Personal life
During her free time, Waleed became more occupied with dress-making and fashion designing. After her marriage, she took a break from acting and spent most of the time learning and teaching sewing. In order to pursue a career as a seamstress, Waleed initiated a dressmaking business and opened a small workroom besides travelling different islands while organizing sewing courses.

Filmography

Feature film

Television

Accolades

References 

Living people
People from Malé
21st-century Maldivian actresses
Maldivian film actresses
Year of birth missing (living people)